The Passage of Lodares (Spanish: Pasaje de Lodares) is a passage located in Albacete, Spain. It was declared Bien de Interés Cultural in 1996.

References 

Buildings and structures in Albacete
Bien de Interés Cultural landmarks in the Province of Albacete